Orchard station is an light rail station in Greenwood Village, Colorado, United States. It is served by the E and R Lines, operated by the Regional Transportation District (RTD), and was opened on November 17, 2006. The station features a public art installation of stamped concrete illustrating magnified apple leaves and stainless steel birds entitled Orchard Memory. It was created by Wopo Holup and dedicated in 2006.

References 

RTD light rail stations
Railway stations in the United States opened in 2006
2006 establishments in Colorado
Greenwood Village, Colorado
Transportation buildings and structures in Arapahoe County, Colorado